= Wales Social Partners Unit =

Welsh governmental advisory body

The Wales Social Partners Unit was established in 2001 to act as an information conduit between the National Assembly for Wales and the social partners.

The unit is based in Cardiff and provides:

- a monitoring and information service, providing weekly summaries of the activities of the Welsh Government and the National Assembly for Wales relevant to the social partners
- summaries of policy documents issued by the Welsh Government and other public sector bodies active in Wales relevant to the social partners
- advice to Assembly policy divisions and other public sector organizations in Wales on how best to consult with and involve social partners in policy development and implementation.

(The social partners are members of business representative organizations in Wales and the Wales Trades Union Congress.)
